The International Defence Exhibition and Seminar, more commonly referred to as IDEAS, is a defence sector event, held biannually, in Pakistan. Since its inception by President Pervez Musharraf in 2000, it has grown to include more than 54,000 trade visitors, 290 delegates members (from 43 countries), 133 national exhibitors and 294 exhibitors from around the world in latest IDEAS 2016 held from 22 to 25 November 2016.

The Pakistan government attaches a high level of importance to IDEAS; despite the fact that it attracts a large number of delegates, it is seen as a vehicle for facilitating their own indigenous arms trade. The level of political involvement has been known to reach the highest echelons, with President Asif Ali Zardari personally inviting the Amir of Kuwait Sheikh Sabah Al-Ahmad Al-Jaber Al-Sabah to the event in 2008 in order to boost the chances of Pakistan's export of its indigenously developed al-Khalid main battle tanks.

The Defence Export Promotion Organisation or more simply DEPO, is the government agency responsible for the success and organisation of IDEAS. Typically they outsource some elements of production of the exhibition to private companies. In 2000 to 2006, Pegasus Consultancy Private Limited organised the event, but after the 2010 conference was forced to cancel because of the catastrophic floods which hit Pakistan late that year, the contract for production of the event was then awarded to Badar Expo Solutions. Assessing how the event had grown since its inaugural occurrence in 2000, speaking at the 'soft launch' for IDEAS 2012, Prime Minister Yousaf Raza Gillani declared the exhibition a "mega event, that has become a global event in a short span of eleven years."
IDEAS is held biennally at Karachi Expo Center with participation from all over the world.
Latest edition of IDEAS was held in 2016 (22-25 November 2016) and the event was  organized by DEPO (Defence Export Promotion Organization) whereas it was inaugurated by Prime Minister of Pakistan Mian Muhammad Nawaz Sharif on DAY ONE and President of Pakistan Mamnoon Hussain attended the strategic seminar as Chief Guest held on evening of 1st day (22 Novemb

er) at Moven Pick Hotel Karachi. The event was heavily attended by local as well as international delegations from more than 43 countries. IDEAS 2016 witnessed 293 International Exhibitors, 133 National Exhibitors and 54,000 trade visitors. The event coordination matters were managed by DG DEPO Major General Agha Masood Akram, Brigadier Waheed Mumtaz, Colonel Fahim Imtiaz Abbassi and Major Ejaz Ahmed Bhatti.

IDEAS 2018 has been planned from 27 to 30 November 2018 at Karachi Expo Center and it is expected to be attended in a more befitting manner where 07-10 country pavilions are expected. Being 10th Edition, the event's special preparations have been geared up under the management of Major General Ahmed Mahmood Hayat and it is expected that IDEAS 2018 will break all the previous records of the exhibition.

The 11th Edition of IDEAS 2020 will be held at Expo centre Karachi on 24 November 2020.

History of the event

IDEAS 2000
The brainchild of the then Chief Executive of Pakistan, Gen. Parvez Musharraf, the first ever Tri-Service Defence Exhibition and the largest International Event of its kind in Pakistan, ‘IDEAS 2000’ was held at the EXPO Centre in Karachi, Pakistan, in November 2000

Mr. Mohammad Rafiq Tarar, President of Islamic Republic of Pakistan, attended the event as Chief Guest. Service Chiefs of Pakistan Navy and Airforce were also present at the event.

There are delegates from 35 countries, with a combined procurement budget of over 20 billion dollars.

IDEAS 2002

Occurring on 16–19 September 2002 at the Karachi Expo Centre, the seminar element of the conference had expanded by this point to include, over two days, the following themes: "Asian Security Scenario" and "The Asian Defence Market". The principal officer in charge of the event was Major General Syed Ali Hamed, then Director General of DEPO, who expected to receive 1500 attendees. The event was launched again by President Pervez Musharraf.

In its second year the event had attracted wide international interest with General Hamid reporting to Dawn newspaper that exhibitors from China, Turkey, France, Russia, Italy, Romania, Ukraine, United Kingdom, USA, UAE and Saudi Arabia were expected to attend.

By 2002, IDEAS was being touted as the largest commercial event in the history of Pakistan with 45 official delegations from 30 countries attending and 110 exhibition stands from 25 countries.

In his speech, President Musharraf said the seminar would go a long way in shortening the technological gap between developed and developing countries especially with regards to defence production and preparedness, he welcomed the international delegates: "Their presence positively reflect[ing] the standing that Pakistan holds in the world as well as the excellent relations that it enjoys with a host of nations."

IDEAS 2004
There was full representation from the Pakistan Armed Forces with all of the Service Chiefs in attendance, and even though India had attempted to curtail US sales to Pakistan, there was a sizeable presence from American companies including from Lockheed Martin and Raytheon.

IDEAS 2006
By 2006 IDEAS was an established biannual international defence expo, it used the tag line (still in use today) of "Arms for Peace" and had matured to announce defence contracts as a major feature of the programme. 226 companies attended the exhibition of which 148 were non-Pakistani.

The first contract to be announced was the co-production of arms and ammunition with Germany and the Republic of Korea and was disclosed by the Chairman of Pakistan Ordnance Factories (POF) Lt General Syed Sabahat Hussain."

Aside from this, Dr Samar Mubarakmand from Pakistan's National Engineering and Scientific Commission (NESCOM) also announced MoUs with undisclosed African and Muslim states of $50 million dollars, adding to NESCOM's existing export deals worth $500 million over the last three years with no transfer of technology necessary.
 According to the Pakistani News Service an "extensive media coverage was made with over 2,200 articles, editorials and news items published worldwide in leading newspapers and industry magazines."

IDEAS 2008

Gaining momentum from the previous exhibition in 2006, General Farooq also reported three months prior to the exhibition to be held at the Karachi Expo Centre on 24–28 November that 92% of exhibition space had already been sold. And unlike the previous four exhibitions, which offered free entry to the expo element of the event, a fee would be levied of $25 per person.

The Prime Minister's address was centred on terrorism and extremism, its negative effects on the perception of Pakistan and the motives of terrorists to destabilise Pakistan's economy. He concluded that IDEAS, with its great many exhibitors, was proof that the terrorists were not having the diverse effect they would hope for. Other notable attendees included: Sindh Governor Dr Ishratul Ebad Khan, Chief Minister Syed Qaim Ali Shah, Chief of Army Staff General Ashfaq Parvez Kayani and the State Minister for Defence Abdul Qayoom Khan Jatoi.

Cancellation of IDEAS 2010
On 15 October 2010, the Director General of DEPO issued a statement cancelling IDEAS, citing "devastating floods that effected 22 million people and resulted in loss of valuable lives and property" as the reason.

Despite cancellation of the event exhibitors were guaranteed their deposit refunds and offered, should they wish to exhibit in 2012, the same rates as provided in 2010.

IDEAS 2012
On 15 September 2011, 11 months after the previous IDEAS was cancelled due to force majeure The event, planned at the Karachi Expo Centre on 7–11 November, will see an enlarged seminar aspect focusing on tri-services military collateral, equipment and security services.

A 'soft-launch' for IDEAS 2012 was held at the Pakistan National Council of Arts in Islamabad on 30 March. Importantly, the event resumed IDEAS' tradition of full establishment-backing with the proceedings inaugurated by Prime Minister Syed Yusuf Raza Gilani; Senior Minister for Defence Production and Industries Chaudhry Pervaiz Elahi; Federal Minister for Defence, Chaudhry Ahmad Mukhtar; Federal Minister for Information and Broadcasting, Dr. Firdous Ashiq Awan; Chairman of the Joint Chiefs of Staff Committee, General Khalid Shahmeem Wynne; the Chief of Army Staff, General Ashfaq Parvez Kayani; and the Chief of Air Staff, Air Chief Marshal Tahir Rafique Butt amongst many other Ministers, Diplomats and Industry representatives.

The DG DEPO, Major General Tahir Ashraf Khan, stated that the exhibition would be bigger in size than ever before and according to Associated Press of Pakistan, with still eight months until the event launches, 60 percent of the space allocated for IDEAS 2012 had been booked with Turkey, China, Germany and France booking larger spaces to display their defence equipment.  Khan also predicted that over 2000 weapons systems would be on display that year.

Prime Minister Gilani signified the core tenet of the exhibition by stating that Pakistan will continue to "develop her military potential that guarantees peace with honour and dignity," furthermore according to The Nation, he said the country has significantly developed indigenous capabilities for producing sophisticated weapon systems and equipment.
The IDEAS 2012 saw a major shift and revisited the glory< Total 209 exhibitors participated, with 74 from Pakistan and 135 from international community.

IDEAS 2014 
IDEAS 2014 Held in November, 2014

IDEAS 2016 
IDEAS 2016 was held from 22 to 25 November 2016 and the event was organized by DEPO (Defence Export Promotion Organization) whereas it was inaugurated by Prime Minister of Pakistan Mian Muhammad Nawaz Sharif on DAY ONE and President of Pakistan Mamnoon Hussain attended the strategic seminar as Chief Guest held on evening of 1st day (22 November) at Moven Pick Hotel Karachi.
 
The event was heavily attended by local as well as international delegations from more than 43 countries. IDEAS 2016 witnessed 293 International Exhibitors, 133 National Exhibitors and 54,000 trade visitors. Under the command of DG DEPO Major General Agha Masood Akram, event was organized by various officers from all three services including Brig Waheed Mumtaz as Director Coordination, Brig Shahid as Director Foreign Delegation, Commodore Muhammad Tariq as Director Navy, Air Commodore Muhammad Tahir as Director Export Promotion Services, Colonel Fahim Imtiaz Abbassi as Colonel Coordination and Major Ejaz Ahmed Bhatti as GSO-2 IDEAS.

The event was conducted with full support of armed forces of Pakistan, Government of Sindh and under the overall umbrella of Ministry of Defence Production with Mr Rana Tanveer Hussain as Minister.

IDEAS 2018 
IDEAS 2018 Held in November, 2018

IDEAS 2020 
IDEAS 2020 was scheduled to be held from 24 November to 29 November 2020, however, it was cancelled due to international pandemic COVID-19.

IDEAS 2022 
IDEAS 2022 was held from 15 November to 19 November 2022 at Karachi Expo Center. 

Major General Arif Malik led the team ex DEPO along with Badar Expo Solution BXSS as event manager. The key members of DEPO include Brigadier Naveed Azam Cheema as Director Coordination, Commodore Muhammad Tahir as Director Inland Invitations, Air Commodore Muhammad Imran as Director Seminar, Lt Colonel Ejaz Ahmed Bhatti as Colonel Coordination DEPO and Lt Col Raja Khayaam as GSO-1 Exhibition. The execution team consisted of Major M Ali Cheema, Major Hassan Khursheed, Major Mansoor, Major Waseem and Wing Commander Raham Karam.

IDEAS 2022 had 218 national exhibitors and 314 international exhibitors and all of the space was booked, totalling 12,600 square meters (135,600 square feet). The exhibition hosted approximately 51,000 trade visitors and lasted four days. The main activities were an executive golf tournament on 14 November, an inauguration ceremony on Day 1, a strategic seminar on artificial intelligence on Day 1, a gala dinner on Day 2 and a closing ceremony chaired by Minister of Defence Production Mr. Israr Khan Tareen on the last day.

IDEAS 2024 
IDEAS 2024 is scheduled to be held from 19 November to 22 November 2024 at Karachi Expo Center.

References

External links
 Official DEPO website
 Video Broadcast of IDEAS 2016
 Videos of IDEAS 2014
 Video Broadcast of IDEAS 2012
 https://web.archive.org/web/20110305162100/http://www.sassu.org.uk/html/ideas_seminar.htm
 http://depo.gov.pk/defenceIndustryNews.php?page=25

Trade fairs in Pakistan
Arms fairs
2000 establishments in Pakistan
Recurring events established in 2000